BelGioioso Cheese Inc. is a cheese manufacturer in Wisconsin. BelGioioso Cheese currently operates eight manufacturing facilities, each plant making particular cheeses that are manufactured, aged, finished, packaged, and shipped from the facility.

History
The company was founded in 1979 by Errico Auricchio, whose great-grandfather was a cheese manufacturer in Italy. Auricchio started the company in Denmark, Wisconsin, where he produced his first cheese, provolone, in a rented cheese plant in Wrightstown, Wisconsin.

In 2021, Belgioioso Cheese entered into a purchase agreement with Groupe Lactalis to purchase Polly-O from the latter, as a requirement by the US Department of Justice's antitrust review of Lactalis's purchase from Kraft Heinz.

Today, the company produces twenty-eight varieties of cheese, including, for example, the brand Polly-O.

References

External links
Official website

American companies established in 1979
Companies based in Green Bay, Wisconsin
Dairy products companies of the United States
Cheesemakers
1979 establishments in Wisconsin